The 1993 Sta. Lucia Realtors season was the first season of the franchise in the Philippine Basketball Association (PBA).

Draft picks

New team
The Sta. Lucia Realtors, a Realty firm who had a basketball team that won two titles in the Philippine Basketball League (PBL), formalized its entry to the pro league by taking over the defunct Presto franchise. The new ballclub absorbed five players from Presto namely Gerry Esplana, Bong Hawkins, Peter Jao, Vergel Meneses and Zaldy Realubit. The Realtors got the biggest catch in the amateur draft, choosing multi-titled national team player Zandro "Jun" Limpot from De La Salle in the UAAP and Magnolia in the PBL as the number one overall pick. They also acquired another national team member Boyet Fernandez, who played for the ballclub in the amateurs but was originally picked by Swift in the annual draft.

Notable dates
February 28: Sta. Lucia defeated the Benjie Paras-less Shell Turbo Chargers in a rousing debut, 112-91, in the opening game of the season at the newly built Cuneta Astrodome. 

March 7: The Realtors scored its third victory without a loss by upsetting the highly favored San Miguel Beermen, 88-80. 

March 12: Sta.Lucia remained unbeaten in the All-Filipino Cup with their fourth win against 7-Up, winning by one point, 95-94. 

November 9: The Realtors outlasted the San Miguel Beermen, 135-129, in a triple-overtime for their second straight win in the Governors Cup semifinals. Sta.Lucia rookie Jun Limpot played a total of 60 minutes.

November 14: Sta. Lucia completed their first round semifinal assignment by winning over Purefoods for the first time in the season, 123-116. 

November 21: The Realtors clinch the win-five incentive and a playoff for the second finals berth by repeating over Purefoods, 120-117.

Award
Top draft pick Zandro Limpot was honored as the season's Rookie of the year.

Roster

Transactions

Trades

Additions

Subtractions
{| cellspacing="0"
| valign="top" |

Recruited imports

References

Sta.
Sta. Lucia Realtors seasons